T-Mobile Workers United (TU) is an organization of T-Mobile USA and Metro by T-Mobile employees joining together for a voice and fair treatment at work. It represents currently 500 members and is affiliated with the Communications Workers of America (CWA) and Vereinte Dienstleistungsgewerkschaft (ver.di), a large German service-sector union. TU is also supported by a coalition of community and labor groups around the world.

In July, 2011, technicians in Connecticut, voted for representation by the Communications Workers of America-TU (CWA-TU). On September 25, 2013, MetroPCS workers in Harlem, NY, voted for a union voice and representation by CWA-TU.

History

T-Mobile US is a subsidiary of Deutsche Telekom, the largest telecommunications company in Europe. Through its subsidiary companies, Deutsche Telekom has operations in around 50 countries worldwide. In Germany, Austria, and the Netherlands, employees are represented by trade unions.

When Deutsche Telekom purchased VoiceStream Wireless in 2001, the CWA helped the company gain approval for access to the U.S. market, with the expectation that Deutsche Telekom would be open to letting employees freely choose union representation in the United States.

The relationship between CWA and T-Mobile US has since eroded. Since it entered the American market in 2001, T-Mobile US has been repeatedly criticized for its employment relations by CWA, ver.di, and other groups. Likewise, American Rights at Work and Human Rights Watch have issued studies of union intolerance at the company’s facilities.

In April 2008, CWA and ver.di formed a joint organization for T-Mobile workers named TU. The new organization was "formed with the goal of overcoming the double standard of Deutsche Telekom recognizing labor rights in Germany but ignoring them in the U.S. This new global union is an effective answer to cross-border investment and the globalization of work."

When CWA and ver.di created the joint organization, they originally named it “T-Union”. However, Deutsche Telekom threatened to sue the organizations for trademark infringement, since they had trademarked the concept of branding their services with a leading "T-" (as they did with the color magenta). So, CWA and ver.di had to rename the union TU for T-Mobile Workers Union.

In August, 2013, TU launched a new website that allows workers at T-Mobile and MetroPCS to connect with each other to build strength in their drive for workplace justice and respect.

TU Affiliates

Ver.di

Ver.di represents 2.3 million workers in Germany, including Deutsche Telekom employees. Ver.di was formed in 2001 when the German Salaried Employees' Union (DAG) merged with four unions of the German Confederation of Trade Unions (DGB).
Ver.di members work in financial services, utilities, health, social services, education, science and research, federal government, media, printing, telecommunications, postal services, logistics, and transport, among other sectors. The headquarters of the trade union is in Berlin.

The Communications Workers of America

CWA represents 700,000 workers in the United States, Canada, and Puerto Rico. The union was established in 1947 and affiliated with the Congress of Industrial Organizations in 1949. CWA represents workers in telecommunications, publishing, the airline industry, public safety, healthcare, education, social work, and broadcasting, among many other industries. It is headquartered in Washington, D.C.

TU Workplace Partnerships
To bring together T-Mobile workers in Germany (Deutsche Telekom) and the United States (T-Mobile US), TU has created a workplace partnership program that connects German and American workplaces. These partnerships build solidarity and allow workers to join together to make positive change in the workplace and respond to bad behavior by management. So far, there are 6 partnerships between German and American call center representatives, retail associates and technicians.

Further reading
 Compa, Lance, "Free Speech and Freedom of Associuation. Finding the Balance. A Position Paper of the International Trade Union Confederation.", Brussels: International Trade Union Confederation, 2013.
 Compa, Lance, "A Strange Case: Violations of Workers' Freedom of Association in the United States by European Multinational Corporations." New York: Human Rights Watch, 2010.
 Logan, John. "Lowering the Bar or Setting The Standard. Deutsche Telekom’s U.S. Labor Practices." Washington, D.C.: American Rights at Work Education Fund, 2009.

References

External links

Official websites
 Tmobileworkersunited.org – Website for T-Mobile workers
 Communications Workers of America
 ver.di

Other Sources
 LoweringTheBarForUs.org – Website with news and information about the T-Mobile campaign.

Telecommunications trade unions
T-Mobile